Theta Chi is an international college fraternity. It was founded on April 10, 1856, at Norwich University then-located in Norwich, Vermont, and has initiated more than 200,000 members and currently has over 8,700 collegiate members across North America.

History

Founding and early years at Norwich

Theta Chi was founded on April 10, 1856, at Norwich University in Norwich, Vermont, by two military cadets, Frederick Norton Freeman and Arthur Chase. A third man, Egbert Phelps, is considered to be the "assistant founder" for lending his help and advice to Freeman and Chase after transferring to Union College in 1854 (he was a member of the Chi Psi fraternity).

Theta Chi's early history is closely connected to the history of Norwich University. In 1866 a massive fire devastated the university, completely destroying the Old South Barracks, where the Fraternity had been founded. This disaster prompted the university to move from Norwich, Vermont to its present location in Northfield, Vermont. In 1873 the university nearly closed due to financial reasons, however brother Charles Dole, then serving as a professor at the university, met all of the university's financial obligations from his own pocket, saving the institution. During fall quarter in 1881, Norwich University was reduced to only 12 students and Theta Chi's membership was reduced to one collegiate member, James M. Holland (1883). In November of that year, Phil S. Randall and Henry B. Hersey approached Holland and insisted that they be allowed to join Theta Chi; Holland agreed, thus saving the Fraternity from extinction.

Growth
There were early efforts to expand Theta Chi to both Dartmouth College and Union College but because of the anti-expansion sentiment among members of the Alpha chapter and unstable conditions at the university, it remained a single entity for 46 years. A Grand Chapter was organized in 1908 to direct the fraternity and promote its growth. On , Beta Kappa fraternity merged with Theta Chi (with the exception of the chapter at Georgia Tech which chose to become a chapter of Lambda Chi Alpha), bringing 16 collegiate chapters and over 6,000 collegiate and alumnus members into the ranks. Unlike other Fraternity mergers, Beta Kappa was completely absorbed into Theta Chi with no changes to the name or Ritual. The foundation chapter was established in 1953 as a charity to provide educational scholarships and assistance. In 1965, the Zeta Gamma chapter was installed at the University of Alberta in Edmonton, Alberta, Canada, making Theta Chi an international fraternity.

Ideals, traditions, and symbols

The Greek motto of Theta Chi is Θηρόποσα Χείρ, which is translated as "An Assisting Hand." Theta Chi's motto was secret from the founding in 1856 until the 1930s, at which time it was made public and incorporated into the fraternity's coat of arms.

When Freeman and Chase founded Theta Chi in 1856 they very clearly spelled out the purpose of the Fraternity in the original Constitution. Article I stated that the objects of Theta Chi were to "bind by closer bonds the members to each other and the mutual assistance of each of its members;" "the advancement and carrying out of any measures at the institution in which it shall be established which shall be of importance to its members," and "the mutual benefit and improvement of all its members." The fraternity continues to guard certain secrets about membership.

The Fraternity's colors are military red and white. Its flower is the red carnation. The national alumni publication is The Rattle, named for the rattlesnake that appears on the Fraternity's coat of arms and badge. It has become a Theta Chi tradition to celebrate Founders Day on April 10, usually as an alumni gathering.

Maxim
The Fraternity's maxim is "Alma Mater First and Theta Chi for Alma Mater," and refers to one of the founding ideals of the Fraternity: loyalty to one's college or university over the course of one's lifetime.

Badge
The badge of Theta Chi consists of a rattlesnake in the shape of the Greek letter "theta" and two swords which form the letter "chi." All badges are gold with the eye of the rattlesnake containing a ruby. Egbert Phelps, Theta Chi's "assistant founder", designed the original badge sometime before the founding date. Freeman ordered the first badges from a Boston jeweler on April 12, 1856, and they were first worn on June 9, 1856.

Coat of arms
The coat of arms official description in heraldic phraseology goes as the following: "Or, on a bend gules, a nowed serpent between two swords, points downwards, palewise all the first. On an esquire's helmet the Crest, an eagle displayed or." The true meaning of the Coat of Arms is known only to brothers of the fraternity.

According to The Manual of Theta Chi, the original design for the coat of arms was suggested by Freeman, and members of Alpha chapter used his ideas to develop an official image. The coat of arms has undergone over a dozen modifications since, with the current design being approved in 1939.

Creed

Frank Schrenk (Kappa/Pennsylvania 1915) wrote the Creed of Theta Chi. It is both an affirmation of the founding principles of Theta Chi and a mission statement for the Fraternity:

The Creed is traditionally recited by members at chapter meetings, and is often discussed in new member education programs to teach the values and ideals of the Fraternity.

Monument

On August 29, 1931, the day of Theta Chi's 75th Anniversary Convention, a stone monument was dedicated at Norwich, Vermont. The Monument of Theta Chi is a remembrance of the founding of Theta Chi Fraternity. The inscription appears as follows:

Theta Chi today
Theta Chi currently has 155 active chapters and five colonies across the United States and Canada and has initiated over 200,000 members since its founding.

Theta Chi Fraternity's collegiate members are involved on their respective campuses with a multitude of leadership organizations, including Omicron Delta Kappa (ODK), the Order of Omega, Student Government Association (SGA), Phi Beta Kappa, Florida Blue Key, and NCAA athletics.

Theta Chi's preferred philanthropies are the United Service Organizations (USO), Wounded Warrior Project, the Children's Miracle Network, the American Red Cross, Relay for Life, The Kyle Charvat Foundation, and Habitat for Humanity. Theta Chi is one of the largest donating organizations to the United Service Organizations (USO).

Local chapter or member misconduct
In 1997, Binaya Oja died participating in a drinking pledging ritual at Clarkson University. Pledges were to drink until they vomited. His family filed a wrongful death lawsuit against the fraternity.

In 2008, Harrison Kowiak suffered a fatal injury while playing a capture-the-flag-like game as part of initiation at Lenoir–Rhyne University. In his family's wrongful death lawsuit filed against the fraternity, it was reported Kowiak's head struck the concrete when he was tackled.

In 2012, Philip Dhanens died due to alcohol poisoning after drinking 37 shots of hard liquor with his fellow pledge brothers at Fresno State University. Three Theta Chi members were arrested and charged for his death following the incident, and as of 2020 the chapter is still inactive.

In 2018, a Theta Chi member and student died due to alcohol poisoning at the University of California, Santa Cruz. The organization was disbanded from the university.

In 2018, a Theta Chi pledge at Drake University sued the fraternity on the local and national levels after a hazing drinking incident left him near death.

In 2019, a Theta Chi member at the University of Arizona sued for medical expenses and severe loss of eye sight after a hazing incident on April 12, 2019. In the claim the pledge cited being beaten and forced to exercise on broken glass while members played loud Nazi music and beat the pledges. During this period a glass of habanero sauce was thrown into the pledges eyes where he suffered chemical burns, chemosis, and a corneal abrasion.

In February 2021, a petition with over 10,000 signatures to suspend the Theta Chi chapter at the University of Massachusetts Amherst emerged after the fraternity hosted several large parties, which were allegedly the cause of higher numbers of COVID cases on the UMass campus.  The chapter was put on an interim suspension, but no other punishments were given out.

In October 2021, the Theta Chi chapter at the University of Massachusetts Amherst was the center of a student protest after claims that a female student was drugged and raped at a party circulated on various social media platforms.  A protest that attracted a crowd of over 300 students turned violent when car windows were broken and a resident of the Theta Chi house was hit with a bottle.  Another petition that had over 30,000 signatures pushed administration to suspend the chapter, but the chancellor at the time, Kumble Subbaswamy, said without an official complaint or report, there was no way for them to properly investigate the incidents.

In December 2022, the Theta Chi chapter and school at Rutgers University–New Brunswick was sued by a freshman who was allegedly forced into drinking life-threatening amounts of alcohol as part of a pledge fell down several flights of stairs and was hospitalized for severe injuries. Shortly after the lawsuit was filed, the letters on the housing for the Theta Chi chapter were taken down.

Chapters

Colonies

Theta Chi has formally colonized at:
Ball State University
Durham, NC
University of Pittsburgh
University of North Texas
York University

Notable alumni

References

External links

 
Student organizations established in 1856
International student societies
North American Interfraternity Conference
Fraternities and sororities in the United States
Carmel, Indiana
Non-profit organizations based in Indiana
1856 establishments in Vermont